The Massacre of Salsipuedes was an organised campaign to eradicate the last remnants of the now extinct Charrúa people. It was executed by the Uruguayan Army under the command of Uruguayan president Fructuoso Rivera. The massacre took place in 1831 on the banks of the Salsipuedes Creek (Spanish for Get-out-if-you-can).

Massacre 
Although Rivera initially maintained good relations with the Charrúa, the increasing dominance of the Europeans and their desire to expand led to hostilities. He therefore organized an extermination campaign known as "La Campaña de Salsipuedes" in 1831. This campaign was composed of three different attacks in three different places: "El Paso del Sauce del Queguay", "El Salsipuedes", and a passage known as "La cueva del Tigre". 

Legend has it that the first attack was a betrayal. Rivera personally knew the tribal leaders and called them to his barracks by the creek later named Salsipuedes. He claimed that he needed their help to defend territory and that they should join forces, however, once the Charrúas were drunk and off their guard, the Uruguayan soldiers attacked them. The following two attacks were carried out to eliminate the Charrúas that had escaped or had not been present. Since 11 April 1831, when the Salsipuedes campaign was launched by a group led by Bernabé Rivera, nephew to Fructuoso Rivera, the Charrúa were then officially claimed to be extinct.

Aftermath 
The official report declared a number of 40 Charruas killed and 300 taken prisoner. The prisoners were then forced to walk 260 km to the city of Montevideo, where they were sold as slaves.

The directory of the Oriental School of Montevideo thought a nearly extinct race would spark the interest of French scientists and the public, and so four of the prisoners were sold to a Frenchman called François De Curel. They were named Senacua Sénaqué, a medicine man; Vaimaca-Pirú Sira, a warrior; and a young couple, Laureano Tacuavé Martínez and María Micaëla Guyunusa, who was pregnant at the time. All four were taken to Paris in 1833, where they were exhibited to the public in a human zoo. The display was not a success and they all soon died in France, including the newborn daughter of Sira and Guyunusa, and adopted by Tacuavé. The child was named María Mónica Micaëla Igualdad Libertad by the Charrúa, yet she was filed by the French as Caroliné Tacouavé. A monumental sculpture, Los Últimos Charrúas was built in their memory in Montevideo, Uruguay.

References

1831 in Uruguay
Massacres in Uruguay
Massacres of ethnic groups
Massacres in 1831
19th-century murders in Uruguay
Genocides in South America